Kaiserslautern (Palatinate German: Lautre) is a city in southwest Germany, located in the state of Rhineland-Palatinate at the edge of the Palatinate Forest. The historic centre dates to the 9th century.

Kaiserslautern is home to about 100,000 people. Additionally, approximately 45,000 NATO military personnel are based in the city and its surrounding district (Landkreis Kaiserslautern), contributing approximately US$1 billion annually to the local economy.

History and demographics

Prehistoric settlement in the area of what is now Kaiserslautern has been traced to at least 800 BC. The recovered relics are now in the Museum for Palatinate History at Speyer.

Medieval period
Kaiserslautern received its name from the favourite hunting retreat of Holy Roman Emperor Frederick Barbarossa who ruled the Holy Roman Empire from 1155 until 1190. The small river Lauter made the old section of Kaiserslautern an island in medieval times. Ruins of Frederick's original castle, built 1152–1160, can still be seen in front of the Rathaus (city hall). A second castle, Nanstein Castle, was built at Landstuhl to guard the western approach to the city. Barbarossa's influence on Kaiserslautern remains today, both in its nickname as a "Barbarossa city" and the open-mouthed pike on the city's coat of arms, reportedly his favorite dish.

The Stiftkirche, Kaiserslautern's oldest church, was constructed in 1250–1350. As the population of Kaiserslautern grew, King Rudolf von Habsburg chartered the town an imperial city in 1276. St. Martin's Kirche (church) was built from 1300–1350 for an order of monks. Today a section of the original city wall still stands in the courtyard of the church.

By 1375, the city of Kaiserslautern was pledged to Electoral Palatinate and therefore became subsequently part of the Wittelsbach inheritance.

Reformation
In 1519, Franz von Sickingen became the owner of Nanstein Castle. He became a Protestant, and in 1522 Nanstein was a stronghold for local nobles favouring the Reformation. Sickingen and the local nobles began their battle against the Archbishop of Trier; but the attack was unsuccessful, and they retreated to Nanstein. Nanstein was then besieged by cannon-armed German Catholic princes. Sickingen died after the castle surrendered, and the Protestant nobility of the Electoral Palatinate were subdued by the Catholic princes.

Count of the Electoral Palatinate Johann Casimir, came to Kaiserslautern during the Thirty Years' War (1618–1648). Spanish occupation in 1621–1632 ended when Protestant Swedish armies liberated the area. The city would fall to invading forces again in an especially violent incident in 1635. Croatian troops within the Austrian emperor's army plundered the city, killing 3,000 of its 3,200 residents. It would not be repopulated for about another 160 years.

Conflict did not end with the Peace of Westphalia in 1648. The Elector of the Pfalz had difficulty with many of his subjects and ordered all castles, including Nanstein, destroyed. The French repeatedly invaded and occupied the area, residing in Kaiserslautern in 1686–1697. Nevertheless, after the treaty of Utrecht it was restored to be part of the Palatinate. During the unquiet episodes in the 18th century, the Palatinate was the scene of fighting between French and German troops of different states. In 1713, the French destroyed Barbarossa's castle and the city's wall towers. From 1793 until Napoleon's defeat at Waterloo in 1815, the area was under French administration.

Bavarian province
As French power declined after 1815, Kaiserslautern and the Palatinate became a Bavarian province and remained so until 1918. After World War I, French troops again occupied the Palatinate for several years.

World War II
In World War II, Allied bombing destroyed more than 85% of Kaiserslautern. The railway and several main roads were primary targets, with the heaviest attacks occurring on 7 January, 11 August, and 28 September 1944. On 20 March 1945, as the last of the 1st Army crossed the Rhine at Remagen, the U.S. 80th Division, 319th Infantry, part of the 3rd US Army, seized Kaiserslautern without resistance. 
The city became part of the French occupation zone after the Second World War. The establishment of the state of Rhineland-Palatinate was ordered on 30 August 1946 as the last state in the western occupation zones by ordinance No. 57 of the French military government under General Marie-Pierre Kœnig. Little reconstruction took place until the currency reform of 1948. The pace of the economy remained slow until 1952, when construction for newly established garrisons of American troops brought economic growth to the area.

Unexploded ordnance from WWII continues to be discovered in and around Kaiserslautern. In May 2012 an unexploded  Allied bomb was found, buried deeply and reportedly covered by water pipe, during a construction project in the downtown area of the city. On 5 September 2013, another WWII bomb was found during construction near the train station in Enkenbach-Alsenborn.

Cold War era
In the late 1940s, Kaiserslautern area became the largest U.S. garrison outside the United States (Kaiserslautern Military Community).

On 14 November 1956, a U.S. Air Force F-86 fighter jet crashed into the district office in the Burgstrasse / Maxstrasse area. In addition to the pilot, two civilians were killed, and numerous wounded. 

With the incorporation of the previously independent communities of Dansenberg, Erfenbach, Erlenbach, Hohenecken, Mölschbach, Morlautern and Siegelbach on 7 June 1969, Kaiserslautern became a city. The University of Kaiserslautern was founded in 1970.

Industry flourished around the time of the first oil crisis (1973). In the 1970s, many industrial companies went through a crisis. In 1981, the spinning mill went bankrupt; Pfaff and Opel fired employees. The downsizing of the American garrison and the withdrawal of the French garrison cost more jobs.

Climate
Kaiserslautern has a moderate climate with adequate rainfall year-round. It is classified as a "Cfb" (Marine West Coast Climate/Oceanic climate) by the Köppen Climate Classification system.

Culture, Tourism, and Sports
Modern-day Kaiserslautern is a centre of information and communications technology, home to a well-known university, a technical college and many international research institutes located throughout the city. Kaiserslautern is a popular destination for tourists, offering a range of attractions, and sites for tourists to visit.  

Town Hall Kaiserslautern is one of the tallest buildings and is located in the city centre. The bar and coffee shop on the top floor provides a panoramic view of the city and surrounding countryside. 

The tallest building in the centre of Kaiserslautern is St. Mary's, a Roman Catholic church, whilst the highest structure in all Kaiserslautern is the television tower in the suburb of Dansenberg, southwest of the city centre.

Kaiserslautern's large botanical gardens feature a Japanese-style garden. Another unusual feature is the Waschmühle (also known as "Wesch"), an enormous  public swimming pool that is the largest in Europe.  There are several pedestrian-only shopping zones with numerous and varied restaurants and bars located in the city centre surrounding the old city (Altstadt). In the Altstadt you will find the "Kaiserbrunnen", a large ornamental fountain with symbols of the city's history such as a sewing machine, as produced by the Pfaff company in the city, a football representing the city's football club and various animals that children can climb.

Kaiserslautern has a diverse culinary sector, offering visitors the chance to sample dishes from across the world. 

Kaiserslautern is located in one of the largest contiguous forested areas in Central Europe, the Palatinate Forest, which offers numerous hiking trails and lakes to visitors.

Notable attractions

Pfalztheater Kaiserslautern

Local theatre Pfalztheater employs more than 300 people and features plays, operas, ballets, concerts, and musicals. The first German performance of West Side Story took place there.  As the arts in Germany are significantly subsidized by the government, its ticket prices are reasonably low. Pfalztheater Kaiserslautern hosts the Else-Lasker-Schüler-Preis awards for German literature.

The Kammgarn

The Kammgarn is classified as a historical site. It served as a spinning factory before being transformed into the cultural heart of Kaiserslautern. This renovation has preserved its historical character while incorporating the latest sound and lighting technologies.  The Kammgarn stands among the top venues in Germany and serves as a first-call club for rising groups and performers as well as established jazz, rock, blues and pop artists in Europe. Performances have included international stars B.B. King, Manfred Mann's Earth Band, Pat Metheny, Uriah Heep and Jan Garbarek.

Gartenschau (garden exhibition)

Better known as the 'Dino Park' because of its lifesize dinosaur models, the Gartenschau is open from April through October and is popular with families. Having begun as a series of botanical displays and enjoying success at the first State Garden Exhibition of Rhineland-Palatinate in Kaiserslautern in 2000, this  park has been transformed into one of the most multi-dimensional cultural centres in Germany.

Fritz-Walter-Stadion

The Fritz-Walter-Stadion is a football stadium that accommodates 48,500 fans. In June 2006, after renovation, the stadium was one of 12 to host the 2006 FIFA World Cup. It is also home to 1. FC Kaiserslautern, which won the Bundesliga four times and the wheelchair basketball team FCK Rolling Devils.

Kaiserslautern Zoo

The Kaiserslautern Zoo was founded in 1968 and is located in Kaiserslautern's Siegelbach neighbourhood. It is home to many different animals including some nearly extinct regional species.

Museums and libraries
Palatinate Gallery of Art/Pfalzgalerie (art gallery, mainly pictures and sculptures from the 19th and 20th century)
Wadgasserhof / Theodor-Zink-Museum (local history)
Stadtbibliothek (Municipal Library)
Universitätsbibliothek (university library of Kaiserslautern)
Hochschulbibliothek (Bibliothek of Fachhochschule)
Pfalzbibliothek (scientific library with a main focus on the Electorate of the Palatinate issues)

Other places of interest in Kaiserslautern, and the surrounding area, are:
 The Humberg Tower, an observation tower on the Humberg hill which was built in 1900 and offers a great view over the Palatinate Forest
 Karlstal (a whitewater canyon)
 Kaiserpfalz, the castle of emperor Barbarossa (Redbeard)
 Nanstein Castle, Landstuhl, a castle in the district
 Hohenecken Castle, in a suburb/ward of Kaiserslautern
 Gartenschau, a horticultural show, including the largest dinosaur show in the EU
 Quaidersberg, a hill and natural monument  outside the city

Education, Science, and Business

Universities in Kaiserslautern
 The Technical University of Kaiserslautern was founded on 13 July 1970. Earlier, it was part of the twin University of Trier/Kaiserslautern. It started with the departments of Mathematics, Physics and Technology. Later many more faculties were added.
 University of Applied Sciences, Kaiserslautern was founded in 1971. The main departments including Applied Logistics & Polymer Sciences, Building and Design, Business Administration, Engineering and Computer Sciences / Microsystems Technology.

Research centres in Kaiserslautern
 German Research Centre for Artificial Intelligence
 Fraunhofer IESE
 Fraunhofer Institute for Industrial Mathematics
 Max Planck Institute for Software Systems
 Association Internationale pour les Technologies Objets

Businesses
Kaiserslautern has a broad-based commercial economy. Among the big companies located in the city are:

Adam Opel AG (engines and components factory)
AMEC Earth & Environmental (environmental consulting and engineering)
Avid Technology (formerly Blue-Order)
Empolis GmbH (content & knowledge management software)
General Dynamics European Land Systems-Germany (until 2002 Eisenwerke Kaiserslautern; amphibious vehicles, mobile bridges for military use)
IKEA
John Deere Research and Development branch
Johnson Controls, formerly Keiper (carseats)
Pfaff Industrie Maschinen AG (sewing machines)
EuroMaint

Religion

Churches
The largest church is St. Mary's (Marienkirche), a Roman Catholic church. There is also the historic Protestant Church of the Apostle (Apostelkirche). At the heart of the city is the large and old Stiftskirche (also Protestant). All three have large pipe organs and occasionally host concerts.

Mosques
In Kaiserslautern there is an Islamic Centre for the Muslim communities situated at the center of the city. The Ditib Fatih Camii is a Turkish mosque in Kaiserslautern. There is also a university mosque at the University of Kaiserslautern. There is a total 3 mosques in Kaiserslautern.

Synagogues
The city was once the site of the magnificent Moorish Revival Kaiserslautern synagogue. Built in 1886, the synagogue's great dome could be seen from across the city skyline. The Nazi government forcibly demolished the synagogue on 31 August 1938. The reason provided for the synagogue’s demolition was to create a route for a Nazi parade, but the event served as an example of the Nazis’ underlying intentions including ethnic cleansing in The Holocaust, even a few months before the Kristallnacht. A memorial archway was constructed at the site in 2002.

US military base

Between 1950 and 1955, Kaiserslautern developed into the largest US military community outside of the United States. For this reason Kaiserslautern is also referred to as "K-town"; a term coined by the early American military population who had difficulty pronouncing the name. The Kaiserslautern Military Community (KMC) is a combined community consisting of Army and Air Force components. The KMC consists of Army facilities at Kleber 32nd Air Defense HQ and Signal Corps, Panzer, Dänner-Kaserne, Landstuhl, Miesau, Einsiedlerhof, Pirmasens, Sembach, Rhine Ordnance Barracks and Pulaski Barracks along with Air Force facilities located at Ramstein Air Base, Vogelweh, and Kapaun Air Station.

Twin towns – sister cities

Kaiserslautern is twinned with:

 Davenport, United States (1960)
 Douzy, France (1967)
 Saint-Quentin, France (1967)
 Newham, England, United Kingdom (1974)
 Bunkyō (Tokyo), Japan (1988)
 Brandenburg an der Havel, Germany (1988)
 Pleven, Bulgaria (1999)
 Columbia, United States (2000)
 Guimarães, Portugal (2000)
 Banja Luka, Bosnia and Herzegovina (2003)
 Silkeborg, Denmark
 Bitola, North Macedonia

Notable people

Countess Palatine Dorothea of Simmern (1581–1631), countess
Mathias Abel (born 1981), footballer
Otto Bradfisch (1903–1994), economist, jurist, and SS-Obersturmbannführer
Wolfgang Demtröder (born 1931), physicist and spectroscopist
Ludwig Fischer (1905–1947), National Socialist lawyer, politician and a convicted war criminal
Mark Forster (born 1983), singer
Wilhelm Frick (1877–1946), politician of the NSDAP; Reich Minister of the Interior in the Hitler Cabinet 1933–1943
Florian Fromlowitz (born 1986), footballer
Reiner Gies (born 1963), boxer, Olympic medalist
Stefanie Giesinger (born 1996), model
Theo Härder (born 1945), computer science professor
Johann Adam Philipp Hepp (1797–1867), physician and lichenologist
Hans Robert Hiegel (born 1954), architect
Raphael Holzdeppe (born 1989), pole vaulter, world champion
Johann Heinrich Jung (1740–1817), author
Klaus Knopper (born 1968), electrical engineer and free software developer
Werner Kohlmeyer (1924–1974), footballer, 1954 World Cup winner
Werner Liebrich (1927–1995), footballer, 1954 World Cup winner
David May (1848–1927), Jewish emigrant to America and founder of department stores that later incorporated Macy’s
Markus Merk (born 1962), football referee
Karl Mildenberger (1937–2018), heavyweight boxer
Willi Orbán (born 1992), footballer
Vanden Plas (formed 1986), progressive metal band
Johan Adam Pollich (1741–1780), doctor, botanist and entomologist
Johann Heinrich Roos (1631–1685), Baroque landscape painter and etcher
Albert Speer (1934–2017), architect and urban planner
Heinrich Steiner (1911–2009), painter and printmaker
Johanna Terwin (1884–1962), actress
Stefanie Tücking (1962–2018), radio and television presenter
Fritz Walter (1920–2002), footballer, 1954 World Cup winner
Ottmar Walter (1924–2013), footballer, 1954 World Cup winner
Zedd (born 1988), Russian-German record producer, DJ, multi-instrumentalist and songwriter

See also
 Betzenberg, a Kaiserslautern district
 Betzenberg Wildlife Park

References

External links

 
History of Kaiserslautern
Website about some restaurant and festival reviews in and around K-Town

 
American diaspora in Europe
Opel
Palatinate (region)